Diepdale is a town in Gert Sibande District Municipality in the Mpumalanga province of South Africa.

References

Populated places in the Albert Luthuli Local Municipality